Lieutenant-Commander Arthur Leyland Harrison, VC (3 February 1886 – 23 April 1918) was an English Royal Navy officer, and World War I recipient of the Victoria Cross, the highest and most prestigious award for gallantry in the face of the enemy that can be awarded to British and Commonwealth forces.

Early life
Harrison was born in Torquay, Devon, and educated at Brockhurst Preparatory School, where he is remembered every Armistice Day and at Dover College. At school Harrison was a tremendous all-round games player and, whilst in the Navy, he played rugby union and was capped twice for the England national rugby union team. He is the only England rugby union international to have been awarded the VC. Rugby league namesake Jack Harrison was also awarded the VC posthumously in 1917

On 15 September 1902 he was posted as a naval cadet to the pre-dreadnought battleship HMS Mars, serving on the Channel Squadron. The following month it was reported that he would be lent to the armoured cruiser HMS Good Hope which was in the last stages of completion before her first commission in November.

First World War
He served aboard the battlecruiser HMS Lion for most of the war, seeing action at the battle of Heligoland Bight in 1914 and battle of Dogger Bank in 1915. He also saw action at the Battle of Jutland in 1916, and was mentioned in despatches

Zeebrugge raid
The Zeebrugge Raid was an attack in April 1918 on the Belgian port of Zeebrugge to stop it being a base for German submarines. The raid was two actions: landing raiding parties on the mole from the obsolete cruiser HMS Vindictive and two ferries and the sinking of three old ships in the entrance of the harbour to block it. Vindictive was fitted with howitzers, flame-throwers and mortars so she could be used against the German defenders and as well as naval raiding parties carried two infantry companies of the 4th Battalion, Royal Marine Light Infantry . 

The official citation for the award:

His body was never recovered. He, along with three others who were missing in action on the Zeebrugge raid, are commemorated on the Zeebrugge Memorial, at the Zeebrugge Churchyard. He is also commemorated by a brass plaque, mounted in the Warrior Chapel at St Mary's Wimbledon.

George Bradford who led the raiding parties from the ferry Iris II was also awarded a posthumous VC for his actions in the raid.

The Medal
His mother Adelaide Ellen Harrison, who lived in Wimbledon, London, received the VC and in 1967 relatives donated it to the Britannia Royal Naval College, Dartmouth, Devon where it is on public display.

See also
 Albert Edward McKenzie
 List of international rugby union players killed in action during the First World War

References

Monuments to Courage (David Harvey, 1999)
The Register of the Victoria Cross (This England, 1997)
VCs of the First World War - The Naval VCs (Stephen Snelling, 2002)

Further reading

External links
News Item (unveiling of a memorial and action account)

1886 births
1918 deaths
British military personnel killed in World War I
British World War I recipients of the Victoria Cross
England international rugby union players
English rugby union players
People educated at Dover College
Rugby union players from Torquay
Royal Navy officers of World War I
Royal Navy officers
Military personnel from Devon
Royal Navy recipients of the Victoria Cross
Royal Navy rugby union players
Rugby union forwards